This page records the details of the Japan national football team in 2005.

General

 The Japan national football team competed in the 2005 FIFA Confederations Cup hosted by Germany, the 2005 East Asian Football Championship hosted by Korea Republic and the 2005 Kirin Cup hosted by Japan.

Schedule

Key
 H = Home match
 A = Away match
 N = Neutral venue

Players statistics

Top goal scorers for 2005

Kits

References

External links
Japan Football Association

Japan national football team results
2005 in Japanese football
Japan